Lidia Pitteri (9 September 1933 – 29 April 2017) was an Italian gymnast. She competed in seven events at the 1952 Summer Olympics.

References

1933 births
2017 deaths
Italian female artistic gymnasts
Olympic gymnasts of Italy
Gymnasts at the 1952 Summer Olympics
Sportspeople from Venice